The Fort Marcy Officer's Residence, also known as the Edgar Lee Hewett House, in Santa Fe, New Mexico, was built in the early 1870s. It was listed on the National Register of Historic Places in 1975.

It is located at 116 Lincoln Ave., at Fort Marcy. Built by the United States Army, it was the home of Edgar Lee Hewett.

It later served as offices for the Museum of New Mexico Foundation.

References

External links

National Register of Historic Places in Santa Fe County, New Mexico
Traditional Native American dwellings
Buildings and structures completed in 1870
Pueblo Revival architecture in Santa Fe, New Mexico